Pollen sac may refer to:

 Structures in plants that hold pollen
 Bee pollen, sacs or balls of pollen packed by bees